Legacy is the third album by American progressive rock band The Flyin' Ryan Brothers, released in 2002.

Track listing

Personnel
Jimmy Ryan – guitars, keyboards, percussion programming, lead vocals, backing vocals, production, arrangements, engineering, mixing, mastering, executive production, design
Johnny Ryan – guitars, keyboards, percussion programming, lead vocals, backing vocals, production, arrangements, engineering, mixing, mastering
Bob Behnke – drums on "Legacy", "Maol Mori", "First Blood", "Yeah, Man!", "Harmony" and "Legacy Reprise"
Chacho – bass on "Maol Mori", "First Blood", "Yeah, Man!" and "Harmony"
Johnny Mrozek – drums on "Baja Breeze", "Cliffs of Moher" and "Stevie Dan", percussion on "Legacy", "Leprechaun's Ball", "Baja Breeze", "Cliss of Moher", "Sweet Virginia" and "Harmony", lead vocals on "First Blood"
William Kopecky – bass on "Legacy", "Leprechaun's Ball", "Baja Breeze", "Stevie Dan" and "Legacy Reprise", fretless bass on "Amazing Grace" and "Cliffs of Moher"
Danny Daniels – keyboards on "Red Red Rose" and "Sweet Virginia"
Jim McClain – vocals on "First Blood"
Michael Angelo Batio – mixing, mastering
Dorothy Kosior – typesetting
Julie Ryan – photography

References

The Flyin' Ryan Brothers albums
2002 albums